Harry Maurice Clark (29 December 1932 – 23 February 2021) was an English footballer who scored 70 goals from 260 appearances in the Football League playing as an inside forward for Darlington, Sheffield Wednesday and Hartlepools United. He also played non-league football for Horden Colliery Welfare. While with Darlington, he was known as "young Harry", to distinguish him from the older Harry Clarke, also a forward, who played football and cricket for Darlington at around the same time.

References

External links
 2006 feature in The Northern Echo, with photograph

1932 births
2021 deaths
Footballers from Newcastle upon Tyne
English footballers
Association football inside forwards
Darlington F.C. players
Sheffield Wednesday F.C. players
Hartlepool United F.C. players
Darlington Town F.C. players
English Football League players